The Maghrib prayer is the fourth daily salat in Islam, offered just after sunset.

Maghrib or Maghreb may also refer to:

 Greater Maghreb, a region of North Africa west of Egypt
 Maghrebis, inhabitants of the Greater Maghreb
 Morocco, whose Arabic name is al-Maghrib, "the Maghrib"
 Moroccans, inhabitants of Morocco
 Maghrebi script, a form of Arabic calligraphy
 Magrib (film), a 1993 Indian Malayalam film
 Maghreb, Iran, a village in Fars Province, Iran

See also
Arab Maghreb Union
Maghrebi mint tea
Barbary Coast
Tamazgha
West